The United States Air Force's  688th Cyberspace Wing is a cyberspace operations unit located at Joint Base San Antonio (Lackland), Texas.

The wing delivers information operations and engineering infrastructure for air, space, and cyberspace military operations. It supports national, joint and Air Force operations.

Component units
Unless otherwise indicated, units are based at Kelly Field Annex, Joint Base San Antonio-Lackland, Texas, and subordinate units are located at the same location as their commanding group.

Wing Staff

 688th Operations Support Squadron

5th Combat Communications Group (Robins AFB, Georgia)

 5th Combat Communications Support Squadron
 51st Combat Communications Squadron
 52d Combat Communications Squadron

26th Cyberspace Operations Group

 26th Network Operations Squadron (Gunter Annex, Maxwell AFB, Alabama)
 33d Network Warfare Squadron
 68th Network Warfare Squadron

38th Cyberspace Engineering Installation Group

 38th Contracting Squadron (Joint Base San Antonio-Lackland, Texas)
 38th Engineering Squadron
 38th Operations Support Squadron
 85th Engineering Installation Squadron (Keesler AFB, Mississippi)

690th Cyberspace Operations Group

 83d Network Operations Squadron (Joint Base Langley-Eustis, Virginia)
 561st Network Operations Squadron (Peterson AFB, Colorado)
 690th Cyberspace Operations Squadron (Joint Base Pearl Harbor-Hickam, Hawaii)
 690th Intelligence Support Squadron
 690th Network Support Squadron
 691st Cyberspace Operations Squadron (Ramstein AB, Germany)
 692d Cyberspace Operations Squadron (Eglin AFB, Florida)

History
In July 1953, United States Air Force Security Service organized the 6901st and 6902d Special Communications Centers at Brooks Air Force Base, Texas. One month later, these two organizations were replaced by the Air Force Special Communications Center, located on the other side of San Antonio, Texas at Kelly Air Force Base.  The center became the Air Force Electronic Warfare Center in July 1975.

Air Force successes in exploiting enemy information systems during Operation Desert Storm led to the realization that the strategies and tactics of command and control warfare could be expanded to the entire information spectrum and be implemented as information warfare. In response, the center was redesignated the Air Force Information Warfare Center on 10 September 1993, combining technical skill sets from the existing center with the Air Force Cryptologic Support Center's Securities Directorate and intelligence capabilities from the former Air Force Intelligence Command.

In May 2007, after 54 years of being aligned with United States Air Force Security Service and its successors, the center became part of Air Combat Command and was reassigned to Eighth Air Force.  This assignment did not last long, for in August 2009 the center was redesignated the 688th Information Operations Wing and was assigned to Twenty-Fourth Air Force of Air Force Space Command.

The Air Force Information Operations Center became the 688th Cyberspace Wing on 18 August 2009 as planned by the initial Air Force Cyber Command plan of 2007 and 2008.

Today the wing has a staff of nearly 1,400 civil and military personnel, and based in the same location as United States Strategic Command's Joint Information Operations Warfare Center. It is currently commanded by Colonel James Hewitt and is subordinate to Sixteenth Air Force.

Lineage
 Designated on 24 July 1953 as the Air Force Special Communications Center
 Organized on 1 August 1953
 Redesignated Air Force Electronic Warfare Center on 1 July 1975
 Redesignated Air Force Information Warfare Center on 10 September 1993
 Redesignated Air Force Information Operations Center on 1 October 2006
 Redesignated 688th Information Operations Wing on 18 August 2009
 Redesignated 688th Cyberspace Wing on 13 September 2013

Assignments
 United States Air Force Security Service (later Electronic Security Command, Air Force Intelligence Command, Air Intelligence Agency), 1 August 1953
 Eighth Air Force, 1 May 2007
 Twenty-Fourth Air Force, 18 August 2009
 Sixteenth Air Force, 11 October 2019 – present

Components
 38th Engineering Installation Group (later 38th Cyberspace Engineering Group, 38th Cyberspace Engineering and Installation Group): 3 February 2000 – present
 318th Information Operations Group (later 318th Cyberspace Operations Group): 1 August 2000 – present

Stations
 Kelly Air Force Base (later Kelly Annex, Lackland Air Force Base. Joint Base San Antionio), 1 August 1953 – present

Awards

List of commanders

See also
 List of cyber warfare forces

Notes

References

External links
688th Cyberspace Wing website

Military units and formations in Texas
0688
Military units and formations established in 2013